Pseudocoraebus is a genus of beetles in the family Buprestidae, containing the following species:

 Pseudocoraebus mocquerysi Thery, 1905
 Pseudocoraebus strandi Obenberger, 1931

References

Buprestidae genera